Sherwood Forest is a 1982 video game published by Phoenix Software.

Gameplay
Sherwood Forest is a game in which the player solves puzzles to progress.

Reception
John Besnard reviewed the game for Computer Gaming World, and stated that "Phoenix has put everything in place to allow them to create a really great adventure game. Sherwood Forest isn't bad, it's just too short."

References

External links
Review in Softline
Review in Softalk
Entry in The Book of Adventure Games

1982 video games
Adventure games
Apple II games
FM-7 games
NEC PC-8801 games
NEC PC-9801 games
Robin Hood video games
Video games developed in the United States
Video games set in forests